The Subic Freeport Expressway (SFEX), formerly referred to as the Subic–Tipo Expressway and North Luzon Expressway Segment 7 (NLEX Segment 7), is a  four-lane expressway that connects the Subic–Clark–Tarlac Expressway to the Subic Freeport Zone in the Philippines. Its alignment traverses the provinces of Bataan and Zambales.

The expressway forms part of Expressway 4 (E4) of the Philippine expressway network.

Route description 

Beginning at the intersection of Rizal and Maritan Highways, the expressway runs northward traversing the wetlands of the former Naval Exchange going towards Argonaut Highway. The alignment curves to the right as it crosses Argonaut Highway and goes up as it enters the Bataan National Park. The alignment then veers on a southeasterly direction traversing the side slopes of the mountain. The road enters Bataan as it exits the national park and there are two Total service areas, with one before the Subic Bay Metropolitan Authority (SBMA) security checkpoint for southbound lanes and near the checkpoint for northbound lanes. It would then curve westward, eastward, pass into one river, and repeats the same direction as before. There is an overpass after passing the bridge and before entering Subic–Clark–Tarlac Expressway (SCTEX). Upon entering SCTEX, there is a toll plaza and the road forks into two, the left towards Jose Abad Santos Avenue (Olongapo–Gapan Road) and the right is a toll plaza leading to SCTEX.

Expansion

As part of NLEX Corporation's expansion and improvement of its toll roads, the expressway was expanded to accommodate an additional carriageway inclusive of two bridges and a tunnel parallel to the existing ones.

Groundbreaking ceremony of the expansion project was held on September 12, 2019. It was expected to be completed in September 2020, but was delayed due to the COVID-19 pandemic. The new carriageway and expansion was opened to traffic on February 19, 2021.

Toll
Subic Freport Expressway (SFEX) employs a barrier toll system, where motorists that use exclusively this expressway pay a fixed toll rate. The toll collection is done at the SFEX Toll Plaza in Tipo.

Meanwhile, motorists that originate from SCTEX are charged of toll rates based on the number of kilometers travelled from their entry point at SCTEX or NLEX upon entry on SFEX at Tipo Interchange. Tickets, meanwhile, are issued to eastbound vehicles from SFEX upon entry on SCTEX at Tipo Interchange and are charged at their respective exit points at SCTEX or NLEX. This is since SCTEX and NLEX are an integrated closed system since 2016.

The electronic toll collection (ETC) system on the expressway uses devices branded Easytrip by its concessionaire, NLEX Corporation, and collection are done on mixed lanes at the toll barriers.

Tolls are charged based on class. In accordance with law, all toll rates include a 12% value-added tax.

Source: Toll Regulatory Board

Exits

See also
Philippine expressway network
List of expressways in the Philippines

References

External link

Toll roads in the Philippines
Roads in Zambales
Roads in Bataan